Refugees Of Rap (Arabic: لاجئي الراب; French: "Les Réfugiés Du Rap") is a Syrian - Palestinian hip-hop group.

Career
Brothers Yaser and Mohamed Jamous created the group Refugees Of Rap in 2007 while settled in a Palestinian refugee camp in Yarmouk, Syria. Their texts offer a glimpse of life in the camp and denounce the situation in Syria. They were forced into exile in 2013 and become refugees in France the same year.

From their collaboration came several artistic projects. From 2007 to 2012 the band performed concerts and performs in Syria in Egypt and Lebanon. At the same time, two albums were released in 2010 and 2014 and are the result of various collaborations such as Tamer Nafar(DAM), Tarabband, and Linda Bitar. After their 2010 album, "Face to Face," was released, they got their own recording studio.

The two rappers knew, while preserving their identity, evolve to more sonorities trap in their latest album (Insomnie) 2018.

Since their arrival in Europe until today, the group has given more than 155 concerts and several festivals and participated in several artistic projects and associations (France, United Kingdom, Spain, Italy, Luxembourg, Germany, Sweden, Denmark, Norway) 

During their career, Refugees Of Rap has attracted the interest of several media such as (Rolling Stone magazine, The World, The Guardian, BBC, ARTE, Vice, Konbini, Radio France, TV5 ... etc)

Refugees of Rap also organized a “rap writing” workshop.

Discography 

Albums

 Face 2 Face (2010)
 The Age of Silence  (2014)
 Insomnia  (2018)

References 



Hip hop groups
Palestinian hip hop musicians
Syrian musical groups